Kitty Foyle may refer to:

In arts and entertainment
 Kitty Foyle (novel), by Christopher Morley
 Kitty Foyle (film), a 1940 film starring Ginger Rogers
 Kitty Foyle (radio and TV series), an American radio and television soap opera
 Kitty Foiled, an animated Tom and Jerry cartoon short

Other uses
 Kitty Foyle (dress), a dress style of the 1940s